Syed Sajid Shah (born October 19, 1974) in Mardan is a Pakistani first-class cricketer. A right-arm fast-medium bowler, Shah debuted in 1993/94 and has since taken over 500 first-class wickets. In 2002 he was fined by the PCB for ball tampering during a domestic one day match. Later he became an actor and now working in Haissam Hussain‘s 1971 based drama Jo Bichar Gaye.

References

External links
 

1974 births
Living people
Pakistani cricketers
Peshawar cricketers
Habib Bank Limited cricketers
Pakistan National Shipping Corporation cricketers
Abbottabad cricketers
Peshawar Panthers cricketers
Cricketers from Mardan